Dareke Young (born June 4, 1999) is an American football wide receiver for the Seattle Seahawks of the National Football League (NFL). He played college football at Lenoir-Rhyne. Dareke went to Middle Creek High School in Apex, NC from 2014 to 2017. In high school, he had 29 catches, 502 yards and 5 touchdowns and only had three losses in his career while also earning  Academic All-Conference honors.

Professional career

Young was drafted by the Seattle Seahawks in the seventh round, 233rd overall, of the 2022 NFL Draft.

References

External links
 Seattle Seahawks bio
 Lenoir–Rhyne Bears bio

1999 births
Living people
Players of American football from Raleigh, North Carolina
American football wide receivers
Lenoir–Rhyne Bears football players
Seattle Seahawks players